Thuriostoma are a genus of moths belonging to the family Tineidae.

It contains only one species: Thuriostoma homalospora Meyrick, 1934 that is known from Samoa.

References

Tineidae
Monotypic moth genera
Tineidae genera